Pierre J. Jeanniot O.C., C.Q. is president and CEO of JINMAG Inc., a consulting, management and investment company which he created in 1990.

Career 

He holds the honorary title of Director General Emeritus of the International Air Transport Association (IATA) in recognition of his major contribution to civil aviation worldwide as Director General and CEO, which he headed from 1993 to 2002. Under his leadership, IATA was transformed into the acknowledged leader of international civil aviation, promoting the interests of the airline community and its partners around the world, and becoming a major supplier of products and services for the industry. Following his retirement from IATA, Jeanniot was chairman of the board of THALES Canada Inc., a subsidiary of the international THALES group, from 2003-2009.

Pierre Jeanniot was president and CEO of Air Canada from 1984-1990. During this time, he directed and implemented the privatization of the State-owned airline, and headed it for the next two years. He previously held senior positions in Operations, Marketing, Strategic Planning and Technical Services, and contributed directly to the development of the first comprehensive flight data recorder - the famous “Black Box”.

Jeanniot served on the board of Scotiabank from 1990 to 2004.  He was a long-standing member of Scotia's executive committee, chairman of its Human Resources and Compensation Committee for senior executives, and chairman of its Succession Committee. He also served on Scotia's Audit Committee and its Corporate Governance Committee.

Jeanniot has also served on the board of directors of airlines and telecommunications companies, airports, air navigation authorities and publishing houses. He currently serves on the Board of a number of hi-tech companies.

In addition to his professional duties, Jeanniot devotes himself to many social and charitable organizations.  He was Chancellor of the Université du Québec à Montréal, from 1995 to 2009, having previously held the position of chairman of the board, as well as president of the institution’s foundation.

Pierre Jeanniot has been Honorary President of the Canadian Cancer Society fund-raising campaign, and presided in a similar capacity for the Youth and Music Canada Foundation.
He served as chairman of the Canadian Unity Council from 1991–92, and was the Founding Chairman of the association “Canadians in Europe” with chapters in France, Belgium and the U.K. In March 2008 he became the founding chairman of the international Foundation on Antivirals, which promotes the research and development of drugs for neglected and emerging diseases in developing countries.

Honours 

Jeanniot’s efforts and accomplishments have been recognized by countries and institutions around the world. He was named Officer of the Order of Canada in 1989, and was appointed Chevalier de la Légion d’honneur by the French government in 1991. In 1995, H.M. King Hussein of Jordan awarded him the Independence Medal of the First Order, and he was named to l’Ordre national du Québec in 2002. Jeanniot was honoured with a Doctorat Honoris Causa, from the Université du Québec in 1988. He received the Management Achievement Award of McGill University’s Faculty of Management in 1989, the Prix Rogers Demers – des Gens de l’Air in 1990, an Honorary Doctorate in International Law from Concordia University in 1997, and an Honorary Doctorate in Science from McGill University in 2006. In 2004, he was inducted into the Québec Air and Space Hall of Fame, and he was made a Fellow of the Royal Aeronautical Society in January 2008.

Education 

Pierre Jeanniot holds a B.Sc. in Physics and Mathematics at Sir George Williams University (now Concordia University), Business Administration at McGill University in Montreal and Advanced Statistical Mathematics at New York University.

Archives
There is a Pierre Jeanniot fonds at Library and Archives Canada. Archival reference number is R15495.

References

Further reading 

Brindley, John F. 1999. Wings for the 21st Century, Geneva & Montreal: IATA.
Cardinal, Jacqueline and Laurent Lapierre. 2009. Pierre Jeanniot: Aux commandes du ciel, Quebec : Presses de l’Université du Québec, 456 p. . Find this book on Amazon.ca or Amazon.fr
Desrosiers, Éric. 2009. "Grande entrevue avec Pierre Jeanniot – Peut-on voler sans risquer la faillite?", Le Devoir, November 2.
Elster, Robert J, ed. 2009. "Pierre Jean Jeanniot", The International WHO’S WHO 2010, London & New York: Routledge, p. 2464.
Lumley, Elizabeth. 2010. "Pierre Jean Jeanniot", Canadian WHO’S WHO 2010, Toronto: University of Toronto Press, vol. XLV, p. 1439.
Mora, David Clarke. 2001. "Chief Pilot", Profit Magazine (Oracle’s E-Business Magazine), vol. 8 (4), November issue, pp. 46–47.
O’Toole, Kevin. 2001. "An Elder Statesman", Airline Business, November issue: pp. 37–40.
Scemama, Corinne. 1997. “Pierre Jeanniot, Le maître des airs”, L’Express, August 14.
Vézina, René. 2010. "Pierre Jeanniot: Partager sa vision avant de l’imposer", Les Affaires, April 3.

External links 
 
 La mémoire des leaders : Pierre Jeanniot (interview of Pierre Jeanniot by journalist René Vézina from Les Affaires – in French)

Businesspeople in aviation
Air Canada people
International Air Transport Association
Academic staff of the Université du Québec
Officers of the Order of Canada
Chevaliers of the Légion d'honneur
Businesspeople from Quebec
Sir George Williams University alumni
McGill University Faculty of Management alumni
New York University alumni
Canadian chief executives
Living people
Year of birth missing (living people)